is an electoral district of the Japanese House of Representatives. The district was established in 1994 as part of the change to single-member districts, and it is currently represented by independent politician Mito Kakizawa.

Areas Covered

Current District 
As of 13 January 2023, the areas covered by this distrtic are as follows:

 Kōtō

since the creation of the district

Elected Representatives

Election Results 
‡ - Also ran in the Tokyo PR district election

‡‡ - Also ran and won in the Tokyo PR district election

References 

Kōtō
Constituencies established in 1994
Districts of Tokyo